David Ngaihte (born 16 December 1989 in Manipur) is an Indian professional footballer who plays as a winger for Tollygunge Agragami.

Career

Early career
With the motive to excel in academics and to get access to better education, David Ngaihte was sent to Delhi.
In the capital, while practising with friends in the evening, as is a norm with the North Eastern guys, a Delhi club named Goodwill FC sported him and offered him to play for them in 2008.

Even then, the college going David Ngaihte wasn't serious about the offer but took it up just for the sake of playing the game he loves.
With nothing to prove, he caught the eyes of the capital's football aficionados and soon earned a berth for the Delhi Santosh Trophy team.

He spent the next three years completing his academics and switching between Delhi clubs. It wasn't until the 2012 Santosh Trophy in Odisha that, David Ngaihte though he could curve out a career for himself in football.

Noticed by Southern Samity in the Santosh Trophy, he joined the Kolkata club and had tremendously contributed for the team's good run in the 2013 I-League 2nd Division that saw them in the final round of the competition.

Rangdajied
David made his professional debut for Rangdajied in the I-League on 4 October 2013 against Dempo at the Jawaharlal Nehru Stadium, Shillong and played the whole match; as Rangdajied drew the match 2–2.

Shillong Lajong
On 5 May 2014 it was announced that Ngaihte has signed for Shillong Lajong on a one-year contract.

Career statistics

References

External links 
 I-league Profile

1989 births
Living people
Footballers from Manipur
Indian footballers
Rangdajied United F.C. players
Shillong Lajong FC players
RoundGlass Punjab FC players
I-League players
NorthEast United FC players
Indian Super League players
Association football wingers
Tollygunge Agragami FC players